Surabaya International School, Indonesia, was founded in 1971 as a non-profit, English-medium, college preparatory school for foreign students under the sponsorship of the American Consulate. It was called the American Consulate School and began operation with 24 students. Today, it is a Pre-K through Grade 12 school governed by a seven-member school board elected by the Foundation consisting of parents of children of the school. The school is the only school in Surabaya accredited by the Western Association of Schools and Colleges. SIS graduates go on to four-year college programs in the US, Australia, Singapore or home country universities. The school staff consists of faculty and administration from eight countries. Of these staff members, 55% have advanced or graduate degrees.

Curriculum

The curriculum is U.S. based education with some modifications. The school offers the Advanced Placement (AP) program in math, science, foreign language, English, computer science, history, geography, art, psychology, and economics. More than 25 nationalities are represented in the school. SIS follows an American system of education with two semesters in the school year. Semester I runs from August–December and semester II is from January to June.

SIS implements the Biological Sciences Curriculum Study Science program, which integrates the fundamental concepts of biology, chemistry, and physics, in a student centered, standards-based curriculum.

Infrastructure

The school opened its current campus in 1995, located in Citraland, in the west of Surabaya, about 15 kilometers (or a 30-minute drive) from the city core. The campus has 48 classrooms with teacher's offices. There are two computer labs, three science labs, demonstration rooms, "Little Theater," and a library.

The present campus occupies a site of 50,000 sq. meters. Facilities include two playgrounds, a full-size athletic field, an Olympic-size swimming pool and a multi-purpose hall that includes a stage, weight room, climbing wall and aerobics room.

Technology

In August 2006, Surabaya International School became a wireless, laptop school. Each enrollee in grades 6-12 is issued a school-owned laptop computer. The school now has BYOD laptop program for grade 6 to grade 12 and uses the Google Classroom platform for all classes.
For EC to grade 5, they using iPad and ChromeBooks for eLearning activity.

The program includes:
 A campus-wide wireless computing environment with a hard-wired connection to and from the teacher's housing compound.
 Paid online resources including periodicals for individual and group research.
 A broadband internet connection to all authorized devices.

Sports

The school has teams in volleyball, soccer, basketball, swimming, and badminton. The school belongs to the IISSAC or Indonesian International Small Schools Activities Conference.

References

External links

Official website
U.S. Department of State page for the school

International schools in Indonesia
Educational institutions in Surabaya
Educational institutions established in 1971
Schools in East Java
1971 establishments in Indonesia